This is the discography of Jamaican reggae group Toots and the Maytals, including their releases as 'the Maytals' as well as the solo discography of their lead singer Toots Hibbert.

Albums

Studio albums

Live albums

Compilation albums

Box sets

EPs

Singles
This list of singles is not in chronological order due to a lack of information and because many Jamaican releases did not have catalogue numbers. All singles refer to the Jamaican releases unless otherwise noted. This first table features solely singles where both sides are by Toots & the Maytals. The second table comprises split singles featuring the group, as there have been numerous releases of this sort. The final third table is solo singles by lead singer Toots Hibbert.

Split singles

Toots Hibbert solo singles

Notes

References

Reggae discographies
Discographies of Jamaican artists